Massingham may refer to:

 Great Massingham, a village in Norfolk, England
 RAF Great Massingham
 Little Massingham, a village in Norfolk, England
 Massingham railway station, a former station which served Great Massingham and Little Massingham

People with the surname
 H. J. Massingham (1888–1952), British writer
 Henry William Massingham (1860–1924), British journalist, father of H. J. Massingham
 Richard Massingham (1898–1953), British actor
 Harold Massingham (1932-2011), British poet and crossword setter
 Daniel Massingham (1991-), Grandson of Harold Massingham

Entertainment
 The Massingham Affair a 1962 novel by Edward Grierson
 The Massingham Affair (TV series), a 1964 BBC Television adaptation

See also
 Messingham (disambiguation)
 Missingham, a surname